Strand Road, also referred to as The Strand, is a major thoroughfare in downtown Kolkata, India. Running along the east bank of the Hooghly River, the road connects Bagbazar to Prinsep Ghat (in the Hastings neighbourhood) via the threshold of Howrah Bridge. South of Prinsep Ghat, Strand Road becomes St. Georges Gate Road.

History
Strand Road was completed in 1828, undertaken by the Lottery Committee, along what was previously a long sedge bank. According to the historian H.E.A. Cotton, the road ran from Prinsep Ghat to Hatkhola Ghat. The area around Prinsep Ghat had a large portion of riverbank reclaimed and thrown into the roadway.

Erected in 1838, Baboo Ghat is a significant monument in Doric Greek style on Strand Road. It was commissioned by Baboo Raj Chundrer Das, husband of Rani Rashmoni, founder of Dakshineswar Kali Temple. Immediately west of the Kolkata High Court is Chandpal Ghat, named after Chunder Nath Pal, who owned a shop at the site for the ‘refreshment of pedestrians and boatmen’. The ghat dates from at least 1774 (predating Strand Road itself) and eventually became the point at which the colonial rulers and administrators of India would arrive and leave the city prior to the advent of rail travel.

Eden Gardens, the oldest cricket ground in India and largest in Asia,  is located beside Strand Road, opposite to Babughat.

Gallery

References

Roads in Kolkata